The 1979 NCAA Men's Water Polo Championship was the 11th annual NCAA Men's Water Polo Championship to determine the national champion of NCAA men's college water polo. Tournament matches were played at the Belmont Plaza Pool in Long Beach, California during December 1979.

UC Santa Barbara defeated UCLA in the final, 11–3, to win their first national title.

Greg Boyer from UC Santa Barbara was named the Most Outstanding Player of the tournament. An All-Tournament Team, consisting of seven players, was also named. For the third consecutive year, the tournament's leading scorer was Scott Schulte from Bucknell (11 goals).

Qualification
Since there has only ever been one single national championship for water polo, all NCAA men's water polo programs (whether from Division I, Division II, or Division III) were eligible. A total of 8 teams were invited to contest this championship.

Bracket
Site: Belmont Plaza Pool, Long Beach, California

{{8TeamBracket-Consols
| team-width=150
| RD3=First round
| RD4=Championship semifinals
| RD2=Consolation semifinals
| RD5=Championship
| RD5b=Third place
| RD1=Fifth place
| RD1b=Seventh place

| RD3-seed1= | RD3-team1=California | RD3-score1=19
| RD3-seed2= | RD3-team2=Air Force | RD3-score2=7
| RD3-seed3= | RD3-team3=UCLA  | RD3-score3=17
| RD3-seed4= | RD3-team4=Bucknell | RD3-score4=7
| RD3-seed5= | RD3-team5=UC Santa Barbara | RD3-score5=21| RD3-seed6= | RD3-team6=Loyola–Chicago | RD3-score6=4
| RD3-seed7= | RD3-team7=Stanford | RD3-score7=13| RD3-seed8= | RD3-team8= Brown | RD3-score8=5

| RD4-seed1= | RD4-team1=California | RD4-score1=9
| RD4-seed2= | RD4-team2=UCLA | RD4-score2=10| RD4-seed3= | RD4-team3=UC Santa Barbara | RD4-score3=10
| RD4-seed4= | RD4-team4=Stanford | RD4-score4=9

| RD2-seed1= | RD2-team1=Air Force | RD2-score1=9
| RD2-seed2= | RD2-team2=Bucknell | RD2-score2=11
| RD2-seed3= | RD2-team3=Loyola–Chicago (3OT) | RD2-score3=11
| RD2-seed4= | RD2-team4=Brown | RD2-score4=10

| RD5-seed1= | RD5-team1=UCLA | RD5-score1=3
| RD5-seed2= | RD5-team2=UC Santa Barbara | RD5-score2=11| RD5b-seed1= | RD5b-team1=California | RD5b-score1=10
| RD5b-seed2= | RD5b-team2=Stanford | RD5b-score2=11| RD1-seed1= | RD1-team1=Bucknell | RD1-score1=9| RD1-seed2= | RD1-team2=Loyola–Chicago | RD1-score2=5

| RD1b-seed1= | RD1b-team1=Air Force | RD1b-score1=10
| RD1b-seed2= | RD1b-team2=Brown | RD1b-score2=15}}

 All-tournament team Greg Boyer, UC Santa Barbara''' (Most outstanding player)
John Dobrott, UC Santa Barbara
Randy Kalbus, Stanford
Kevin Robertson, California
Rick Sherburne, UCLA
Carlos Steffens, California
Craig Wilson, UC Santa Barbara

See also 
 NCAA Men's Water Polo Championship

References

NCAA Men's Water Polo Championship
NCAA Men's Water Polo Championship
1979 in sports in California
December 1979 sports events in the United States
1979